Los Aposentos is a small forested park area with a number of springs and two small lakes. It is located a few kilometers south of the city of Chimaltenango in Guatemala. It was formerly known as "Finca la Alameda" and renamed to Los Aposentos in 1929.

An area of 0.15 km2, including the lakes was declared a national park in 1955.

References

National parks of Guatemala
Protected areas established in 1955
1955 establishments in Guatemala